Emma Marie Cadwalader-Guild, also known by Cadwallader-Guild, (August 27, 1843-c. 1911) was an American artist, notable for her sculpture busts of significant figures. Her subjects included President William McKinley, Andrew Carnegie, and George Frederick Watts, among others. Cadwalader-Guild spent much of her career abroad and achieved particular notoriety in England and Germany.

Cadwalader-Guild works were exhibited at numerous locations, including the Royal Academy of Arts, the 1894 Paris Salon, the 1876 Philadelphia Centennial Exposition, and the Louisiana Purchase Exposition, also known as the 1904 St. Louis, or Louisiana Exposition, where she won a bronze medal. Cadwalader-Guild primarily worked in marble and bronze.

Life and career 
Cadwalader-Guild was born in Zanesville, Ohio in 1843. The variations on Cadwalader-Guild's name are attributed to differences between the English and American spellings. Cadwalader-Guild's father was part of the English Cadwallader family. Her father was a doctor. While young, Cadwalader-Guild showed an interest in art, as her mother painted with oils and watercolors in a studio in their home. On October 8, 1861, Cadwalader-Guild married Reverend Edward Chipman Guild of the Unitarian church. The pair had two children, Eliza and Rose. After her marriage, Cadwalader-Guild realized her love and talent for art  while she and her husband were living in Boston where she spent time with local artists in their studios. Her first recorded exhibition was in 1876 at the Women's Pavilion of the Philadelphia Centennial Exhibition, while she was living in Waltham, Massachusetts. Reports note she was inspired to take up sculpting when she came across an African-American man at a market. Cadwalader-Guild spent weeks molding her own rendition of the man, which became known as Free or Freed. Another source attests that her first great work was a lifesize David in clay she completed in 1875.  

Cadwalader-Guild had no formal training and was self-taught. She attended William Rimmer's anatomy lectures as her only formal instruction. She was also known for working without models. Portraiture was her primary subject matter; however, Cadwalader-Guild did create other forms. Her historical subjects include an Endyimon in marble and a corresponding bronze statuette, a marble bust of Lotos/Lotus, a bust of the Head of St. Monica, the mother of St. Augustine, a marble figure of Electron/Electro/Elektron, and Psyche. Her historical subjects were praised for their originality and craftsmanship.

Though her primary work was sculpture, she also painted, though mostly without patronage. Her focus was on still lives and landscapes. She also painted a series of oil sketches. Cadwalader-Guild often had showings of her work in her studio.

Once Free was completed, Cadwalader-Guild moved abroad in the mid-1880s, exhibiting and working in multiple cities. She placed Free in her London studio, where it was well-received by critics. She traveled and study the masters of art and opened studios in cities with strong art communities, including London, Berlin, Italy, and Frankfurt, to increase the profitability of her travels. While in Europe, she produced pieces that were well-received and brought her recognition including marble and bronze busts of British Prime Minister William Gladstone, who contacted her for in-person sittings, something he had not done with any other sculptor.

She returned to the United States at an unknown date to make a bust of President McKinley at the encouragement of then-United States Ambassador Andrew White. Cadwalader-Guild had long wanted to create a study of her fellow Ohioan. However, McKinley did not arrive to the scheduled sittings in the summer due to the campaign of 1900. She returned to Berlin and came back to the United States the following summer to meet McKinley in Canton, Ohio where he was staying. Again McKinley was too busy to pose for sittings but promised to sit for her when he returned to Washington D.C. in October. However, McKinley was assassinated in September 1901 and Cadwalader-Guild made the bust from photographs. Congress purchased the bust for $2,000. It was placed in the President's Room in the Capitol and moved to the Senate Marble Room in 2000.

 From 1885 to 1888 her primary address was in London. The Royal Academy in London listed her 1888 address as in Frankfurt and in 1891, Hamburg, and in 1893, Berlin.  The 1894 Paris Salon listed a London address. By 1897 she had relocated the majority of her work to Berlin where her work consisted mostly of portraiture of nobility. At the 1904 Louisiana Purchase Exposition she is listed as still working in Berlin. Prior to December 1905 Cadwalader-Guild purportedly spent several years in England. During this time she made her busts of Gladstone and other notable figures including royalty. Another report attests that prior to March 1905 Cadwalader-Guild spent several years in Berlin before returning to America to work in the Bryant Park Building. At that time she was working on the bust of an unknown but prominent New York resident.

Little is known of Cadwalader-Guild's death but that it occurred around 1911, and in the United States.

Notable work and exhibitions 
 Cadwalader-Guild exhibited at the Royal Academy multiple times throughout her career. She exhibited her bronze statuette Free in 1885; a still life painting in 1886; and two busts in 1887, one of the inventor Peter Brotherhood, and the other of British politician Frederick Seager Hunt. At the Royal Academy in 1888 she had a bronze portrait medallion and a bust of the Rev. Canon Wilberforce exhibited, in 1891 a bronze bust of an Indian rider, in 1893 her busts of the artist George Frederick Watts, Esq. R.A. and of Henry Shore, Esq., and in 1898 her bronze statuette Endymion.

Cadwalader-Guild also exhibited at the Glaspalast in Munich starting in 1883, the Paris Salon, the Glasgow Institute of Fine Arts, and at least twice at the Walker Art Gallery in Liverpool, once with her bronze "Endymion" in 1891 and again in 1893 with her busts of Henry Thode, Esq. and G. F. Watts. At the Louisiana Purchase Exposition Cadwalader-Guild had five pieces exhibited; her bust of G. F. Watts, her marble Endymion, her bust of Joseph Joachim, her bust of Lincoln, and her sculpture of Electron. At the Paris Salon two pieces were exhibited in 1894, Free and a plaster bust called Tramonto.

List of known notable subjects 

President William McKinley, 1901, bronze bust, 74.9 by 47 by 36.8 centimeters; currently at the Senate Marble Room at the United States Capitol 
Andrew Carnegie, 1908, bronze bust, Civil Engineers Club of New York 
Henry Edward Manning, 1892, plaster relief 
George Frederick Watts, 1891, bronze bust, 61.2 by 60.5 by 35.8 centimeters, exhibited at the Royal Academy in 1893 and the 1904 Louisiana Purchase Exposition, currently at the Whitworth Art Gallery of the University of Manchester
Peter Brotherhood, bronze bust, exhibited at the Royal Academy in 1887 and marble bust; the bronze bust was sold at auction in November 2017, the marble's location is unknown
Frederick Seager Hunt, bronze bust, exhibited at the Royal Academy in 1887
President Abraham Lincoln, 1904, bronze bust, exhibited at the 1904 Louisiana Purchase Exposition 
Princess Helena of the United Kingdom, also known as Princess Christian of Schleswig-Holstein, 1889, terracotta bust, location currently unknown
William Ewart Gladstone, 1905, two busts, one bronze and one marble, location currently unknown 
Princess Irene of Hesse and by Rhine, also known as Princess Henry of Prussia, 1905, marble bust, location currently unknown; 1904, bronze bust and a statuette of Princess Irene and her son Prince Henry, locations currently unknown
Duchess Helene of Mecklenburg-Strelitz, also known as Helen of Saxe-Altenburg and Princess Helene Van Sachsen Attenberg, 1897, mixed media marble and bronze bust; 1902, marble bust 
Frau von Roth, bust in bronze and marble

Henry Thode, 1894, plaster bust 
Hans Thoma, 1894, bronze bust 
Joseph Joachim, 1895, marble bust, exhibited at the 1904 Louisiana Purchase Exposition
Feilx Weingartner, 1896, bronze and plaster busts 
Wilhelmina of the Netherlands, bust in marble 
General Samuel C. Armstrong, 1905, bronze bust, gifted to the Hampton Institute
Conrad von Studt, 1903, bronze bust, originally at University of Münster, current location unknown 
Reverend Canon Wilberforce, bust, exhibited at the Royal Academy in 1888
Henry Shore, Esq., bust, exhibited at the Royal Academy in 1893
Paderewski, 1896, bronze relief 
Baron von Rheinbaben

Other known works

Sculpture 

Free/Freed, 1876, bronze statuette, exhibited at the Glaspalast in 1883, the Royal Academy in 1885, and the Paris Salon in 1894 owned by descendant;  a copy of Free, 1911, in basswood by German artist Otto Braun, currently at the Crystal Bridges Museum of American Art
Endymion, 1886, marble statue, exhibited at the 1904 Louisiana Purchase Exposition; location currently unknown 
Endymion, 1896, bronze statuette, 33.8 centimeters, exhibited at Royal Academy in 1898, sold at auction in February 2018
Lotos/Lotus, 1904, marble bust, location currently unknown 
Head of St. Monica, the mother of St. Augustine, 1905, mixed media of marble and bronze, location currently unknown
Tramonto, a plaster bust, exhibited at the Paris Salon in 1894, location currently unknown 
Electron/Elektron/Electro, 1895, a bronze and a marble statue, the bronze statue given to the German postmaster general Heinrich von Stephan by the Society of the Electrical and Electrochemical Industry of Frankfurt and placed at the Imperial Postal Museum in Berlin, today Museum für Kommunikation Berlin, second exhibited at the 1904 Louisiana Purchase Exposition, location of the bronze Elektron at the Museum für Kommunikation Frankfurt
David, 1875, clay sculpture 
Psyche
Ruberta
Frond, 1894, alabaster bust 
 Bronze portrait medallion, exhibited at the Royal Academy in 1888
Indian Rider, bronze bust, exhibited at the Royal Academy in 1891

Painting 

 Still life, exhibited at the Royal Academy in 1886
 A series of oil sketches of unknown subjects

Reception 
The reception to Cadwalader-Guild's work was positive. Her sculpture Lotos was lauded in the German Times as, "This psychic masterpiece stamps Mrs. Guild unequivocally as an artist of the very first rank."

Cadwalader-Guild's bust of Joseph Joachim was also complimented by the German Times, saying, "[the bust is] by far the best and most significant work accomplished by any of the small army of sculptors who have been moved to do the violin-patriarch's characteristic head."

Her marble study of Wilhelmina of the Netherlands so impressed Empress Augusta Victoria that when she saw it on public display, she ordered it to be taken to the palace. Princess Sophia of Saxe-Weimar, Wilhelmina's aunt, had Cadwalader-Guild make a duplicate as a coronation gift for Wilhelmina.

United States politician John Hay described her bust of President McKinley as, "The power of the head is remarkable. It is a great expression of the personality of the man."

In an article about Cadwalader-Guild the Boston Evening Transcript wrote, "...the work of Mrs. Guild shows unmistakable talent and such as fresh, free spirit of originality that one can almost accept the alleged dictum of Berlin that Mrs. Guild 'is the greatest genius in sculpture that America has ever had.'"

Her bronze statuette Endymion was complimented in the 1896 Studio International with, "...since the Italian bronzes of the Quattrocento no finer work of the kind has been seen than this." Similarly, upon the completion of her marble Endymion a complimentary piece was written in The International Studio which focused on the originality, pose, and composition of the sculpture.

An author for The International Studio wrote about the skill of her paintings in the journal's November 1897 to February 1898 volume, saying, "Mrs. Guild has a strong predilection for painting...which she does with no small degree of success, as her free and vigorous landscape studies abundantly testify...This pronounced feeling of hers for colour explains to me how in... her sculpture she employs means which really overstep the bounds of plastic art."

Notes

References

External links 
 Letters exchanged between Cadwalader-Guild and artist Thomas Rossiter at the Smithsonian Archives

1843 births
19th-century American women artists
American women sculptors
Artists from Ohio
People from Zanesville, Ohio
1910s deaths